Muirkirk is a small village in East Ayrshire, southwest Scotland. It is located on the north bank of the River Ayr, between Cumnock and Glenbuck on the A70.

Conservation
The Muirkirk & North Lowther Uplands Special Protection Area was set up to protect the populations of breeding hen harrier (Circus cyaneus), golden plover (Pluvialis apricaria), merlin (Falco columbarius), peregrine falcon (Falco peregrinus) and short-eared owl (Asio flammeus).

Population
The 2001 United Kingdom census recorded a population of 1,865.

History
The village developed around its church, which was built in 1631, and was a fertile recruiting ground for the Covenanter movement. In recent times, the village has fallen into decline due to its geographic isolation and the collapse of its coal and iron industries, but attempts are being made at regeneration through the Muirkirk Enterprise Group which was set up in 1999.

Notable people
 Jocky Dempster, former professional footballer with Queen of the South F.C., St Mirren and Clyde F.C.
 Danny Masterton, footballer with Ayr United and Clyde, lived almost his whole life in Muirkirk.
 Willie Ferguson, professional footballer with Chelsea F.C. and Queen of the South F.C.
 John Lapraik, poet
 John Loudon McAdam, who developed his system of road laying in Muirkirk
 Isobel Pagan (Tibby) - poet 
 Bill Shaw, pre-war footballer 
 Prof Sir Tom Symington, pioneer in Cancer research

References

External links

 Muirkirk's Official Website
 Muirkirk Enterprise Group

Villages in East Ayrshire